Choanocotyle is a genus of flatworms in the family Choanocotylidae. Species infect freshwater turtles.

References

External links 

 

Plagiorchiida genera